En tu ausencia (English: In Your Absence) is a 2008 Spanish drama film written and directed by Iván Noel.

Plot
Pablo is a 13-year-old boy living in a small, tight-knit village in the Andalusian countryside of Southern Spain. He has recently lost his father in a tragic accident and his only friend is an older teenaged girl named Julia. One day, a mysterious, well-dressed man named Paco arrives in town and enters Pablo's life. Neglected by his mother after his father's recent death, Pablo forms a strong attachment to Paco, despite the warnings of the townspeople.

Cast

References

External links

Spanish coming-of-age drama films
2008 films
2000s coming-of-age drama films
2008 drama films
2000s Spanish films